Min Shin Saw (died 1167) was heir-apparent of the Pagan Dynasty of Burma (Myanmar) from  1117 to 1151. His father King Sithu I sent the crown prince into exile to present-day Ava (Inwa) which the prince subsequently turned into a highly cultivated region. After Sithu was assassinated in 1167, Min Shin Saw returned to Pagan to claim the throne. There, he was consecrated king but later that night, was assassinated by Narathu, his younger brother and the assassin of their father.

Disagreements with the king
According to the Hmannan Yazawin chronicle, Min Shin Saw had two specific run-ins with his father. In the first incident, the king's newest young queen, a daughter of the king of Pateikkara—a tributary to Pagan, stayed on the royal couch beside the king when the king's sons came to pay homage to him. Min Shin Saw refused to kneel down in front of the young queen whose name was Pabhavati. He said: "I'm the eldest son. Shall this Kala wench abide in the couch in my presence before all the ministers and councilors?" He left, saying "I'm not well." (Kala today means Indian but may have meant foreign in those days. Pateikkara is believed to be a kingdom near today's Chin State.)

In the second incident, Alaungsithu awarded a royal attendant named Ananda Thuriya a robe of princely attire, worn only by princes. When the attendant showed up with the robe at the royal council, Min Shin Saw stripped the robe off Ananda Thuriya, saying "This garment is not for a king's usher or nurse to wear. Only the king's brothers and sons are worthy to wear it." The old king was greatly disturbed that Min Shin Saw was acting like a king even when the king was still alive.

Life in exile
In 1151/1152, the king first sent Min Shin Saw to prison but at the intervention of his mother Queen Yadanabon, reduced the sentence and sent him to exile. The prince and his followers settled near today's Ava, a few miles northeast of Pagan. The prince dammed the Aung Pinle Lake, and another lake nearby. He built three canals, creating additional cultivated land. Because the land was fertile, three crops a year were raised. Min Shin Saw's enlightened policies raised funds for his treasury, and attracted a host of followers. He invited scholars and monks to write many books and teach them.

Despite his success in exile, the prince remained loyal to his father. At Pagan, however, Alaungsithu had chosen Narathu as the heir-apparent.

Return to Pagan and death
In 1167, Alaungsithu fell ill and was assassinated by Narathu who could not wait to be king. Min Shin Saw did not know about Narathu's treachery, and came back to Pagan to claim the throne. Narathu met him at the port, and proclaimed his elder brother the new king. Min Shin Saw was at once consecrated king. But later that night, Narathu poisoned Min Shin Saw, and claimed the throne for himself.

References

Bibliography
 
 
 
 

Burmese monarchs
Pagan dynasty
Assassinated Burmese people
1167 deaths
1110s births
People executed by poison
Heirs apparent who never acceded
12th-century Burmese people